Pasihapaori Chidziva (born May 1985), known as Pasi William Sachiti, is a Zimbabwean born British entrepreneur. Sachiti has worked on several ventures, including Clever Bins (an advertising solution for public spaces), an automated library assistant and the Academy of Robotics - a driverless car company.

Biography

Career

Early ventures 
In 2009, Sachiti appeared on the BBC investment programme Dragons' Den seeking investment for an advertising company - Clever Bins. Clever Bins manufactured solar-powered digital advertising bins intended for public spaces. Unfortunately, the pitch was described by Peter Jones as "the biggest load of bull I've ever heard in the Den", and as a result Sachiti was unable to secure funding. The company continued to trade for three years, before closing in 2013.

In 2013, Sachiti founded mycityvenue, a digital concierge and holiday company which was eventually acquired by UK holiday company Secret Escapes.

In 2015, Sachiti studied at artificial intelligence and robotics at Aberystwyth University, but did not complete his studies. During that time, Sachiti worked on a project to build a robot librarian - Hugh. The robot was capable of taking verbal commands and navigating users around the Hugh Owen library.

Kar-go 
In 2016, Sachiti (along with a team of academics) received a £10,000 prize from Aberystwyth University to build a company to address the last mile delivery problem. This led to the founding of the Academy of Robotics - a vehicle manufacturer that developed an autonomous delivery vehicle called Kar-go.  Kar-go has been nominated for several awards and has a production facility in Small Dole near Brighton in the UK as a result of a partnership with Pilgrim Motorsports. In July 2019, Sachiti launched Kar-go at the Goodwood Festival of Speed. In November 2020 the Kar-go autonomous vehicle was approved for use on roads in the United Kingdom. In November 2021, the British Royal Air Force announced that they had chosen to trial Kar-go for autonomous deliveries on UK airbases.

Other ventures 
In February 2020, Sachiti published a Medium article titled ‘Trees of Knowledge’ which detailed an idea to improve access to education in Africa by using embedded computing technology to allow natural landmarks (e.g. trees) to broadcast pre-loaded content to individuals in the vicinity with access to a mobile device.

Personal life

In 2013, Sachiti received press attention after his wife hired a private investigator to track his movements. The investigator planted a tracking device underneath Sachiti's vehicle, which was subsequently mistaken for an explosive device. No evidence of a bomb was found. In 2022, Sachiti purchased RAF Neatishead, a former cold war military base. During the summer of 2022, Sachiti started a thread on Reddit asking for expertise resurrecting the site's cold-war-era military radar. The story was picked up by VIce News and Fox News.

Awards and recognition

 In 2010, Sachiti was nominated for HSBC Start-up stars for his company and innovation Clever Bins
 In 2013, Sachiti won the Zim Achievers awards in Business Innovation for Clever Bins
 In 2017, Sachiti was awarded the Aberystwyth InvEnterPrize for Kar-go
In 2021, Sachiti was awarded Disrupter of the Year by the Great British Entrepreneur Awards

References

External links 
 Academy of Robotics website

People from Harare
Zimbabwean businesspeople
1985 births
Living people